Philippe-Thomas Chabert de Joncaire, also known as Nitachinon by the Iroquois, was a French army officer and interpreter in New France who established Fort Machault in the 18th century. During his career, he largely served as a diplomat with the indigenous nations rather than as a soldier.

Early life
Philippe-Thomas Chabert de Joncaire was the eldest son of Louis-Thomas Chabert de Joncaire (1670–1739) and Marie-Madeleine Le Gay. He was baptized in Montreal on January 9, 1707. He was the older brother of Daniel-Marie Chabert de Joncaire de Clausonne.

Joncaire was given by his father to the Seneca at the age of 10 and was raised by the Iroquois.

Career

Early career

Joncaire joined the colonial French army in 1726 and attained the rank of second ensign in 1727. On July 23, 1731, he married Madeleine Renaud Dubuisson.

In 1735, Joncaire succeeded his father as the principal interpreter and political agent from New France to the Iroquois. His responsibilities included easing tensions between the indigenous peoples and the French when either side acted aggressively. He also negotiated a deal for the Senecas to supply Fort Niagara with fresh meat. By 1744, his successes resulted in the offering of a dead-or-alive reward by the British.

Céloron expedition

Joncaire resigned his post on the frontier in 1748 with a claim of ill health, two years after the death of his wife. The following year, he was recalled to be the interpreter for Pierre-Joseph Céloron de Blainville's expedition along the Ohio River. He was captured in Sonioto by Shawnees while establishing first contact and was nearly killed before the intervention of an Iroquois chief.

Chiningué

In early July 1750, Joncaire was sent with 12 soldiers to Chiningué to establish a permanent French base. He found that the native population preferred the traders from Pennsylvania and Virginia over the French. By 1751, Joncaire held the rank of captain in the French colonial army. When larger French forces arrived with Paul Marin de la Malgue in 1753, he found support among the local Delaware and Shawnee who wanted to challenge the Iroquois.

Fort Machault

In 1753, Governor Jean de Lauson sought to build a fortified trading post at the confluence of the Allegheny River and French Creek at Venango. That year, the English traders were expelled from Venango and Joncaire established Fort d'Anjou with a permanent garrison at the location.

In December 1753, Major George Washington arrived at Fort d'Anjou on an expedition to deliver British demands and assess the French military situation. Joncaire directed Washington to his superior officer at Fort LeBoeuf but informed Washington during a dinner about French intentions to "take possession of the Ohio".

In 1754, Philippe-Thomas was replaced by Michel Maray de La Chauvignerie as the officer in charge of constructing the fort, which was eventually renamed Fort Machault.

Later life
After the fall of Montreal to the British in 1760, Joncaire went to France and was knighted in the Order of Saint Louis.

Joncaire had died by 9 November 1766, soon after the end of the Seven Years' War.

See also
 Tanacharison

Notes

References

French Army officers
Order of Saint Louis recipients
French Canadian people of the French and Indian War
Interpreters
French diplomats